The Piper PA-15 Vagabond and PA-17 Vagabond are both two-seat, high-wing, conventional gear light aircraft that were designed for personal use and for flight training and built by Piper Aircraft starting in 1948.

Development
The PA-15 was the first post-World War II Piper aircraft design.  It utilized much of the same production tooling that created the famous Piper Cub, as well as many of the Cub structural components (tail surfaces, landing gear, most of the wing parts).  The Vagabond has a wing that is one bay shorter ( versus ) than that on the Cub, which led to the unofficial term describing the type: Short-wing Piper. This allowed the aircraft to be built with minimal material, design and development costs, and is credited with saving Piper Aircraft from bankruptcy after the war.

The prototype PA-15 made its first flight on 3 November 1947, with deliveries of production aircraft beginning in January 1948.
 
Vagabonds used a new fuselage with side-by-side seating for two instead of the Cub's tandem seating.

The PA-17 Vagabond version features dual controls, enabling it to be used for pilot training. It has a bungee cord shock-absorbed landing gear (solid gear on the PA-15), and a  Continental A-65 engine.

Operational history

In March 2018 there were still 167 PA-15s and 101 PA-17s registered in the USA.

There were 13 PA-15s and 12 PA-17s registered in Canada in March 2018.

Variants

PA-15 Vagabond
Side-by-side two-seater powered by one 65hp Lycoming O-145 engine. 387 built, plus one converted from a PA-17.
PA-17 Vagabond
Also known as the Vagabond Trainer a variant of the PA-15 with dual-controls, shock-cord suspension and powered by one 65hp Continental A-65-8 engine. 214 built.

Specifications (PA-15)

See also
1948 in aviation (first flight)
Related development:
Piper Pacer

Comparable aircraft:
Cessna 120/140
RagWing RW11 Rag-A-Bond
Wag-Aero Wag-a-Bond

References

External links

High-wing aircraft
Single-engined tractor aircraft
Vagabond
1940s United States civil utility aircraft
Aircraft first flown in 1948